A list of films released in Japan in 1966 (see 1966 in film).

List of films

See also 
1966 in Japan
1966 in Japanese television

References

Footnotes

Sources

External links
Japanese films of 1966 at the Internet Movie Database

1966
Lists of 1966 films by country or language
Films